The following is a list of University of Delaware people, which includes alumni, current and former faculty, and recipients of honorary degrees.

Alumni

Business
 Kurt Akeley (b. 1958), computer graphics engineer
 Mary Pat Christie (b. 1963), investment banker
 John P. Costas (b. 1957), CEO, UBS Investment Bank
 Michael F. Koehler, Chief Executive Officer, Teradata
 Michael Mignano, American businessperson
 Adam Osborne (1939–2003), computing pioneer
 Larry Probst (b. 1950), Chairman of the Board, Electronic Arts (formerly CEO); Chairman of the U.S. Olympic Committee and member of the International Olympic Committee
 Ömer Sabancı (b. 1959), Turkish businessman 
 Carl Truscott, Senior Vice President, ASERO Worldwide
 Wang Xing (b. 1979), CEO, Meituan-Dianping

Authors
 Steve Alten (b. 1959), science fiction author
 Jarret Brachman, terrorism author
 Siobhan Carroll (b. 1980), professor, scholar, writer
 Paul Cherry, business author
 Edward Ezell (1939–1993), author
 Martha Gandy Fales (1930–2006), art historian, curator
 Morrison Heckscher (b. 1940), art historian, curator
 Maureen Johnson (b. 1973), author
 Thomas Leitch (b. 1951), author, academic 
 Esther Tuttle Pritchard (1840–1900), minister, editor

Artists
 Michael Barone, art photographer
 Craig Cutler, photographer
 Linda Day Clark, photographer
Tim Kreider (b. 1967), cartoonist

Politics
 Thurman Adams, Jr., (1928–2009) Democratic member of the Delaware Senate
 L. Heisler Ball (1861–1932), U.S. Senator and U.S. Congressman
 Jo Anne B. Barnhart (b. 1950), Commissioner of Social Security
 Jill Biden (b. 1951), educator and First Lady of the United States as the wife of President of the United States Joe Biden
 Joe Biden (b. 1942), President of the United States, Vice President of the United States, former U.S. Senator, former chair of the Senate Foreign Relations Committee and Senate Judiciary Committee
 J. Caleb Boggs (1909–1993), U.S. Senator, U.S. Congressman, Governor of Delaware
 John F. Brady (b. 1959), Delaware politician
 David P. Buckson (1920–2017), veteran of World War II and a member of the Republican Party, who served as the 15th Lieutenant Governor of Delaware, for nineteen days the 63rd Governor of Delaware and the 37th Attorney General of Delaware
 Eric Buckson, Commissioner, Kent County Levy Court
 Daniel E. Button (1917–2009), U.S. Congressman
 Theophilus C. Callicot (1826–1920), politician
 John Carney (b. 1956), U.S. Congressman, Governor of Delaware
 Thomas R. Carper (b. 1947), U.S. Senator, U.S. Congressman, and Governor of Delaware
 Christopher Christie (b. 1962), Governor of New Jersey
 Thomas Clayton (1777–1854), U.S. Senator, U.S. Congressman
 Carl Danberg (b. 1964), Delaware Attorney General and Commissioner of the Delaware Department of Correction
 Reha Denemeç (b. 1961), co-founder and deputy chairman (research and development) of the ruling Justice and Development Party (AK Parti) in Turkey
 Kendel Sibiski Ehrlich (b. 1961), First Lady of Maryland
 Lütfi Elvan (b. 1962), Minister of Finance and Treasury, Turkey
 J. Allen Frear, Jr. (1903–1993), U.S. Senator
 Don B. Hughes (b. 1940), Maryland State Delegate
 Horace G. Knowles (1863–1937), diplomat
 John G. McCullough (1835–1915), Attorney General of California and Governor of Vermont
 Thomas McKean (1734–1817), Founding Father, signer of the Declaration of Independence
 Louis McLane (1786–1857), veteran of the War of 1812, U.S. Senator, U.S. Secretary of State, U.S. Secretary of the Treasury
 Louise Mushikiwabo (b. 1961), Rwandan Foreign Minister
 David Plouffe (b. 1967), campaign manager of the Barack Obama presidential campaign, 2008, political consultant, senior advisor to the president
 Mike Purzycki (b. 1945), 56th Mayor of Wilmington, Delaware
 George Read (1733–1798), Founding Father, signer of the Declaration of Independence
 George R. Riddle (1817–1867), U.S. Senator, U.S. Congressman
 Janet Rzewnicki (born 1953), Delaware State Treasurer
 Steve Schmidt (b. 1970), campaign manager of the John McCain presidential campaign, 2008, co-founder of The Lincoln Project, graduated in 2013
 James Smith (1719–1806), Founding Father, signer of the Declaration of Independence
 Nick Smith (b. 1934), U.S. Republican Congressman from Michigan

Entertainment
 Susan Barnett (b. 1972), KYW-TV news anchor
 Colleen Broomall (b. 1983), actress
 Vincenza Carrieri-Russo (b. 1984), Miss Delaware USA 2008, Miss Delaware United States 2014 
 Neil Casey (b. 1981), actor, comedian, writer
 Tommy Conwell (b. 1962), rock musician
 Antje Duvekot (b. 1976), singer/songwriter
 John Faye (b. 1966), rock musician
 Bryan Gordon, television and film director
 Suzanne Graff, actress
 Steve Harris (b. 1965), actor
 Vicki Hirsch, theater instructor and actress
 Page Kennedy, actor
 Amanda Longacre (b. 1989), Miss Delaware 2014
 Mark McClafferty, film and television producer, writer 
 Matt O'Donnell (b. 1972), WPVI morning anchorman
 Marvell Scott (b. 1973), sports reporter for WABC-TV
 Susan Stroman (b. 1954), Broadway director, choreographer, performer
Scott Swift, father of singer/songwriter Taylor Swift
Caroline Murphy (b.1998), performer, legendary host of Kilimanjaro Safari

Education
 John L. Anderson (b. 1945), President of Illinois Institute of Technology
 David L. Chicoine, President of South Dakota State University
 Lawrence A. Cunningham (b. 1962), scholar, author, and the Henry St. George Tucker III Research Professor of Law at George Washington University
 Charles F. Hummel (b. 1932), curator and deputy director at the Winterthur Museum, Garden and Library
 Rakesh Jain (b. 1950), professor of tumor biology at Harvard Medical School
 Dwight Lanmon (b. 1938), director of Corning Museum of Glass and Winterthur Museum, Garden and Library
 Steven Leath (b. 1957), President of Iowa State University
 Brian Lukacher, professor of art history at Vassar College
 Donald Mullett (1929–2013), interim president of Lincoln University (Pennsylvania), Lincoln University (Missouri), and Cheyney University
 Mary Patterson McPherson (c. 1935), former President of Bryn Mawr College
 Milo Naeve (1931–2009), art historian and curator at the Art Institute of Chicago
 Jules Prown (b. 1930), art historian and professor of art history at Yale University
 John A. H. Sweeney (1930–2007), curator and administrator at the Winterthur Museum
 James W. Wagner (b. 1953), President of Emory University

Judicial
 William B. Chandler, III, Chancellor, Delaware Court of Chancery
 Hugh M. Morris (1878–1966), Judge for the U.S. District Court for the District of Delaware
 Leonard Stark (b. 1969), Judge for the U.S. District Court for the District of Delaware
 Leo E. Strine, Jr. (b. 1964), Chancellor, Delaware Court of Chancery
 John E. Wallace, Jr. (b. 1942), Associate Justice of the New Jersey Supreme Court

Journalism
 Peter Bailey (b. 1980), journalist
 Rod Beaton (1951–2011), sports journalist for USA Today
 Katherine Boehret (b. 1980), journalist
 Colleen Broomall (b. 1983), journalist
 David E. Hoffman, writer. journalist, and Pulitzer Prize-winner
 Jeff Pearlman (b. 1972), journalist

Military
 Charles Craig Cannon (1914–1992), United States Army officer who served as Aide-de-camp to Dwight D. Eisenhower after World War II
 John M. Custer III, United States Army officer
 Joseph H. Harper (1901–1990), World War II airborne officer, who later commanded the United States Army Infantry School
 Robert W. Kirkwood (1756–1791), American Revolutionary War officer; died in 1791 during the battle of St. Clair's Defeat
 Julian Smith (1885–1975), World War II United States Marine Corps General

Science
 Rakesh Agrawal, National Medal of Technology and Innovation Laureate and Professor of Chemical Engineering at Purdue University
 Brian Atwater (b. 1951), geologist
 Terrell Ward Bynum (b. 1941), Director of the Research Center on Computing and Society at Southern Connecticut State University, Professor of Philosophy
 Carole Chaski (b. 1955), forensic linguist
 Roger Craig (c. 1977), computer scientist and Jeopardy! champion
 Robert W. Gore (1937–2020), inventor of Gore-Tex fabrics
 Walter Lafferty (1875–1964), optical physicist
 Holly Michael, hydrogeologist 
 David L. Mills (b. 1938), Internet pioneer
 Daniel Nathans (1928–1999), biologist and Nobel Prize winner
 G. Raymond Rettew (1903–1973), chemist and pioneer of mass production of penicillin
 Siddhartha Roy (b. 1954), structural biologist, Shanti Swarup Bhatnagar laureate
 Mohsen Shahinpoor (b. 1943), engineer
 Peter Thejll (b. 1956), astrophysicist, climate expert
 Lodewijk van den Berg (b. 1932), astronaut
 Lynn M. Walker, fellow of the American Institute of Chemical Engineers

Sports
 Mike Adams (b. 1981), professional football player
 Nasir Adderley (b. 1997), professional football player
 Robbie Agnone (b. 1985), football player
 Matt Alrich (b. 1981), lacrosse player
 Dawn Aponte (c. 1971), football executive
 Petar Arsić (b. 1973), basketball player
 Josh Baker (b. 1986), football player
 Bryan Barrett (b. 1977), Lacrosse player
 Nate Beasley (1953–2010), football player
 Urban Bowman (1937–2018), American football and Canadian football coach
 Cliff Brumbaugh (b. 1974), MLB player
 Scott Brunner (b. 1957), football player
 Nick Bucci (1932–2019), football player
 Michael Byrne (b. 1986), football player
 Bob Carpenter, Jr. (1915–1990), former owner of the Philadelphia Phillies
 Brennan Carroll (b. 1979), football coach
 Larry Catuzzi (c. 1935), football coach
 Chris Collins (b. 1982), lacrosse player
 Bill Cubit (b. 1953), football coach 
 Mondoe Davis (b. 1982), football and Canadian football player
 Richard Dean (1956–2006), fashion and advertising photographer, former player for Canadian Football League
 Elena Delle Donne (b. 1989), WNBA player with the Washington Mystics; played basketball and volleyball at Delaware
 Pat Devlin (b. 1988), quarterback for the NFL Miami Dolphins
 Anthony DiMarzo, lacrosse player
 Leon Dombrowski (1938–1998), football player
 Marc Egerson (b. 1986), basketball player
 Jamin Elliott (b. 1979), football player
 Joe Flacco (b. 1985), football player
 Eric Fromm (b. 1958), tennis player
 Keevin Galbraith (b. 1979), lacrosse player
 Rich Gannon (b. 1965), football player / NFL analyst CBS Sports
 Brian Gorman (b. 1959), MLB umpire
 Gino Gradkowski (b. 1988), football player
 John Grant, Jr. (b. 1974), lacrosse player
 Dallas Green (1934–2017), MLB player and manager
 Scott Green (b. 1951), NFL referee
 Bob Greene (b. 1958), fitness guru
 Andy Hall (b. 1980), football player
 Jordan Hall (b. 1984), lacrosse player
 Conway Hayman (1949–2020), football player
 Mickey Heinecken (b. 1939), football coach
 Tim Jacobs (b. 1970), football player
 Cindy A. Johnson, basketball player
 Dennis Johnson (b. 1951), football player
 Greg Justice (b. 1972), football player
 Gardy Kahoe (1950–2010), football player
 K. C. Keeler (b. 1959), football coach
 Jeff Komlo (1956–2009), football player
 Mike Koplove (b. 1976), MLB player
 Chad Kuhl (b. 1992), MLB player
 Peter Maestrales (b. 1979), baseball player and Olympian (2004)
 Kęstutis Marčiulionis (b. 1977), basketball player
 Joe McGrail (b. 1964), football player
 Joe McHale (b. 1963), football player
 Tom Mees (1949–1996), ESPN anchor
 Kevin Mench (b. 1978), baseball player
 Joe Minucci (b. 1981), football player
 Jeff Modesitt (1964–1990), football player
 Matt Nagy (b. 1978), football player and coach
 Harding Nana (b. 1981), basketball player
 Al Neiger (b. 1939), baseball player
 Mohamed Niang (b. 1976), basketball player
 Ben Patrick (b. 1984), football player
 Bob Patton (b. 1954), football player
 Mike Pegues (b. 1978), basketball player and coach
 Jim Quirk (b. 1940), football official
 Raven (b. 1964), a.k.a. Scott Levy, professional wrestler
 Dan Reeder (b. 1961), football player
 Steve Schlachter (b. 1954), American-Israeli basketball player
 George Schmitt (b. 1961), football player
 Tyresa Smith (b. 1985), basketball player
 Tony Storti (1922–2009), football coach and college athletics administrator
 Jon Striefsky (b. 1986), football player
 Ivory Sully (b. 1957), football player
 Joe Susan (b. 1955), football coach
 Ronald Talley (b. 1986), football player
 Hal Thompson (1922–2006), football player
 Anthony Walters (b. 1988), football player
 Richard Washington (b. 1985), football player
 Vic Willis (1876–1947), Hall of Fame baseball player
 Paul Worrilow (b. 1990), football player

Honorary degree recipients 
 Byong Man Ahn (born 1941), 2004 – academic
 Robert Ballard (b. 1942), 2001 – oceanographer, discoverer of the RMS Titanic
 Joe Biden (b. 1942), 2004 – President of the United States, Vice President of the United States, former United States Senator (D-Delaware)
 John C. Bogle (1929–2019), 1999 – founder and CEO of The Vanguard Group
 Ben Carson (b. 1951), M.D., 1997 – neurosurgeon
 Alfred D. Chandler, Jr. (1918–2007), 2002 – business historian
 Rita R. Colwell (b. 1934), 2003 – former Director of the National Science Foundation
 Louis Freeh (b. 1950), 1999 – former Director of the Federal Bureau of Investigation (FBI)
 Adrian Hall (b. 1959), 2007 – British actor, thespian
 Daisaku Ikeda (b. 1928), 2000 – Buddhist religious leader, President of Soka Gakkai International
 Paul R. Jones (1928–2010), 2004 – art collector, Paul R. Jones Collection of African American Art
 Audrey F. Manley (b. 1934), 2002 – former United States Surgeon General; President of Spelman College
 Geoffrey Marcy (b. 1954), 2004 – astronomer, discoverer of the first extrasolar planet, 51 Pegasi b
 J. W. Marriott, Jr. (b. 1932), 2005 – Marriott International
 Mary McAleese (b. 1951), 2002 – President of Ireland
 George J. Mitchell (b. 1933), 2003 – Former United States Senator (D-Maine)
 Joseph Neubauer (b. 1941), 2006 – CEO of ARAMARK
 Russell W. Peterson (1916–2011), 2006 – former Governor of Delaware, scientist
 Martin A. Pomerantz (1916–2008), 2001 – physicist and astronomer
 Cal Ripken Jr. (b. 1960), 2008 – baseball player
 William V. Roth (1921–2003), 2003 – former United States Senator (R-Delaware)
 W. D. Snodgrass (1926–2009), 2005 – Pulitzer Prize-winning poet
 Walter K. Stapleton (b. 1934), 1998 – Federal Judge on the United States Court of Appeals for the Third Circuit
 Susan Stroman (b. 1954), 2005 – Tony Award-winning Broadway director, choreographer, film director, and performer.
 E. Norman Veasey (b. 1933), 2003 – Chief Justice of the Delaware Supreme Court
 Craig Venter (b. 1946), 2004 – biologist, founder of The Institute for Genomic Research
 Paul A. Volcker (1927–2019), 2001 – former Chairman of the Federal Reserve
 John J. Williams (1904–1988), 1975 – former United States Senator (R-Delaware)
 Jamie Wyeth (b. 1946), 2002 – realist painter

Faculty
 Gene Ball, Computer Science
 Allen Barnett (b. 1940), Electrical Engineering and Computer Science
 Ralph Begleiter (b. 1949), Communications & Political Science, Distinguished Journalist in Residence
 Mark Bowden (b. 1951), Distinguished Writer in Residence
 E. Wayne Craven (1930–2020), Art History
 Bill Fleischman (1939–2019), sports journalist and adjunct professor in journalism (1981–2009)
 Xiang Gao, world-class violinist
 Linda Gottfredson (b. 1947), Educational Psychology
 Richard Hanley, Philosophy
 Donald West Harward, Philosophy, former president of Bates College
 Richard F. Heck (1931–2015), Chemistry, discoverer of Heck reaction, 2010 Nobel Prize in Chemistry Laureate
 Christine Leigh Heyrman, History
 William Innes Homer (1929–2012), Art History
 Muqtedar Khan (b. 1966), Political Science
 Peter Kolchin (b. 1943), History
 Mark Samuels Lasner (b. 1952), Senior Research Fellow
 David Legates, Climatology 
 Leo Lemay (1935–2008), English
 David L. Mills (b. 1938), Electrical and Computer Engineering
 Frederick Nelson (1932–2009), Professor of Geography and Director of University of Delaware's Permafrost Group
 David L. Norton (1930–1995), Philosophy
 R. Byron Pipes (b. 1941), Mechanical Engineering
 William Poole (b. 1937), Economics; former President of the Federal Reserve Bank of St. Louis; scholar in residence; former professor at Brown University and Johns Hopkins University
 Martin Postle, Art History
 Ramnarayan Rawat, History 
 Arnold L. Rheingold (b. 1940), Chemistry
 W. David Sincoskie (1954–2010), Computer Engineering
 David Smith (b. 1948), Biology
 Elaine Salo (1962–2016), Anthropology and gender studies
 Jacob Joseph Taubenhaus (1884–1937), Plant Pathology (1909 to 1916)
 Charles Tilly (1929–2008), social scientist
 Don A. J. Upham (1809–1877), Mathematics; owner and editor of The Delaware Gazette for three years 
 Barbara A. Williams, Astrophysics
 Shien Biau Woo (b. 1937), Physics and Astronomy, former Lieutenant Governor of Delaware
 Ben Yagoda (b. 1954), English

References

Delaware, University of
University of Delaware

University of Delaware